The 2021 Turin municipal election took place in Turin, Italy, on 3 and 4 October 2021, to elect the mayor and the 38 members of the Turin city council. Since no mayoral candidate won a majority of votes on the first round, a runoff was held on 17 and 18 October 2021. The second round was won by the centre-left coalition candidate Stefano Lo Russo, member of the Democratic Party, who was officially inaugurated as new mayor of Turin on 27 October 2021.

The incumbent mayor of Turin, Chiara Appendino of the Five Star Movement, did not run for re-election.

Electoral system 
The voting system is used for all mayoral elections in Italy, in the cities with a population higher than 15,000 inhabitants. Under this system, voters express a direct choice for the mayor or an indirect choice voting for the party of the candidate's coalition. If no candidate receives 50% of votes during the first round, the top two candidates go to a second round after two weeks. The winning candidate obtains a majority bonus equal to 60% of seats. During the first round, if no candidate gets more than 50% of votes but a coalition of lists gets the majority of 50% of votes or if the mayor is elected in the first round but its coalition gets less than 40% of the valid votes, the majority bonus cannot be assigned to the coalition of the winning mayor candidate.

The election of the City Council is based on a direct choice for the candidate with a maximum of two preferential votes, each for a different gender, belonging to the same party list: the candidate with the majority of the preferences is elected. The number of the seats for each party is determined proportionally, using D'Hondt seat allocation. Only coalitions with more than 3% of votes are eligible to get any seats.

Background

Centre-left primary election

Parties and candidates
This is a list of the parties (and their respective leaders) which will participate in the election.

Declined candidates

Withdrew

Centre-left coalition
 Mauro Salizzoni, medic and regional councilor of Piedmont (since 2019)

Declined

Centre-left coalition
 Sergio Chiamparino, President of Piedmont (2014–2019) and Mayor of Turin (2001–2011)
 Guido Saracco, Rector of Politecnico of Turin since 2018

Five Star Movement
 Chiara Appendino, Mayor of Turin since 2016

Opinion polls

First round

Second round

Damilano vs. Lo Russo

Parties

Results

See also 
 2021 Italian local elections

References 

Turin
Turin
2021 elections in Italy
2020s in Turin
October 2021 events in Italy
Elections postponed due to the COVID-19 pandemic